Proceso a la conciencia is a 1964 Argentine film.

Cast
 Guillermo Battaglia		
 Carmen de la Maza		
 Mercedes Llambí		
 Conchita Núñez
 Luis Rodrigo		
 Eduardo Rudy		
 Antonio Vilar		
 Olga Zubarry

External links
 

1964 films
1960s Spanish-language films
Argentine black-and-white films
Films directed by Agustín Navarro
1960s Argentine films